This article lists the squads for the 2021 COSAFA Women's Championship, the 9th edition of the COSAFA Women's Championship. The tournament is a women's international football tournament for national teams organised by COSAFA, teams from Southern Africa, and was held in Nelson Mandela Bay from 28 September to 9 October 2021. In the tournament were involved twelve national teams: nine teams from COSAFA and three teams from CECAFA, who were invited as guests. Each national team registered a squad of 20 players.

The age listed for each player is on 28 September 2021, the first day of the tournament. The numbers of caps and goals listed for each player do not include any matches played after the start of tournament. The club listed is the club for which the player last played a competitive match prior to the tournament. The nationality for each club reflects the national association (not the league) to which the club is affiliated. A flag is included for coaches that are of a different nationality than their own national team.

Group A

Angola
Coach: Sousa Garcia

The squad was announced on 21 September 2021.

Malawi
Coaches: McNerbert Kazuwa and Andrew Chikhosi

A preliminary squad was announced on 7 September 2021. The squad was reduced prior to the beginning of the tournament.

Mozambique
Coach: Felizarda Lemos

The squad was announced on 17 September 2021.

South Africa
Coach: Desiree Ellis

The squad was announced on 16 September 2021.

Group B

Botswana
Coach: Gaoletlhoo Nkutlwisang
On 27 September 2021, it was announced Nkutlwisang tested positive for COVID-19 and wouldn't travel with the team, who would be coached by Thaloba Nthaga, Belindah Moatswi, and Thabo Motang.

A preliminary squad was announced on 15 September 2021.

South Sudan
Coach:  Shilene Booysen

Tanzania
Coach: Bakari Shime

The squad was announced on 20 September 2021.

Zimbabwe
Coach: Sithetheliwe Sibanda

A preliminary squad was announced on 14 September 2021.

Group C

Eswatini
Coach: Dumisani Makhanya

The squad was announced on 23 September 2021.

Namibia
Coach: Woody Jacobs

The squad was announced on 28 September 2021.

Uganda
Coach: George Lutalo

A provisional squad was announced on 3 September 2021.

Zambia
Coach: Bruce Mwape

The squad was announced on 16 September 2021.

Player representation
Statistics are per the beginning of the competition.

By club
Clubs with 5 or more players represented are listed.

By club nationality

By club federation

By representatives of domestic league

References

2021